Chaim Avraham Dov Ber Levine (1859/1860 – 1938), known as "the Malach" (lit. "the angel"), was a rabbi and founder of the Malachim (Hasidic group).

Biography 
Levine was one of the closest followers of Sholom Dovber Schneersohn, the fifth rebbe of Lubavitch, and was the tutor of his son, Yosef Yitzchok Schneersohn. Upon his arrival in New York in 1923, he was welcomed by Shraga Feivel Mendlowitz, the rosh yeshiva (dean) of Yeshiva Torah Vodaath in Brooklyn.

Levine parted ways with the Lubavitch group, and the Malachim became separate from the Lubavitch movement. However, he continued to teach Chabad works from the first generations of the movement, and subscribed to the core theosophy of Chabad. After Levine's death, Yankev Schorr led the group.

References

External links
 "The Malach" by Dr. Yitzchak Levine, Jewish Press, August 6, 2015 Biographical sketch of the Malach and his son Zalman.
 Rabbi Chaim Avroham Dover Levine (Cohen) at kevarim.com
 Rabbi Raphael Zalman Levine at kevarim.com Includes a scan of biographical sketch of R' Zalman on his fifteenth yartzeit, by Prof. Reuven Sugarman, Yated Neeman, July 13, 2007 p. 38-39.

1938 deaths
American Hasidic rabbis
Year of birth uncertain
People from Williamsburg, Brooklyn
Chabad-Lubavitch related controversies

he:מלאכים (קבוצה חסידית)
1859 births